Grain Crossing Halt (TQ 863 753  ) was a halt on the Hundred of Hoo Railway between Stoke Junction Halt and Port Victoria station in the UK. It was opened on 1 July 1906 and closed to passengers on 11 June 1951. A bus service operated until 3 September 1951, when it was replaced by Grain station. Although officially named Grain Crossing Halt the station nameboard read Grain Halt

References

Sources.

External links
 Kent Rail
 Grain Crossing Halt station on navigable 1940 O. S. map

Disused railway stations in Kent
Former South Eastern Railway (UK) stations
Railway stations in Great Britain opened in 1906
Railway stations in Great Britain closed in 1951
1906 establishments in England
1951 disestablishments in England
Transport in Medway